Dzenzursky is a stratovolcano located in the southern part of the Kamchatka Peninsula, Russia.

See also
List of volcanoes in Russia

References

Volcanoes of the Kamchatka Peninsula
Complex volcanoes
Stratovolcanoes of Russia
Mountains of the Kamchatka Peninsula
Holocene stratovolcanoes
Holocene Asia
Pleistocene stratovolcanoes